Qixin Road is a station on the Shanghai Metro, which services Line 12 and opened on December 19, 2015. It is the western terminus of Line 12.

Nearby places
Shanghai's former Vivo City is connected to the station via the B2 floor.

References

Railway stations in Shanghai
Line 12, Shanghai Metro
Shanghai Metro stations in Minhang District
Railway stations in China opened in 2015